MKL/megakaryoblastic leukemia 1 (also termed MRTFA/myocardin related transcription factor A) is a protein that in humans is encoded by the MKL1 gene.

Function 

The protein encoded by this gene is regulated by the actin cytoskeleton and is shuttled between the cytoplasm and the nucleus as a result of actin dynamics. In the nucleus, it coactivates the transcription factor serum response factor, a key regulator of smooth muscle cell differentiation, in an interaction mediated by its Basic domain. It is closely related to MKL2 and myocardin, with which it shares five key conserved structural domains.

Clinical significance 

This gene is involved in a specific translocation event that creates a fusion of this gene and the RNA-binding motif protein-15 gene. This translocation has been associated with acute megakaryocytic leukemia. It also functions in the process of normal megakaryocyte maturation.

Research 
Evalarted MKL1 expression is observed in breast cancer and can predict chemosensitivity and patient survival. MKL1 may be a promising biomarker of clinical value for breast cancer.

See also 
 Serum response factor

References

Further reading